HMS Tralee was a Hunt class minesweeper of the Royal Navy from World War I.

See also
 Tralee, County Kerry

References
 

 

Hunt-class minesweepers (1916)
Royal Navy ship names
1918 ships